Rainer Brüderle (born 22 June 1945)
is a German politician and member of the Free Democratic Party (FDP). He served as Minister of Economics and Transport of Rhineland-Palatinate from 1987–1998. On 28 October 2009, he was appointed Federal Minister for Economics and Technology in the second cabinet of Chancellor Angela Merkel. Following his election in May 2011 as chairman of his party's parliamentary group, Brüderle resigned as Federal Minister for Economic Affairs and Technology.

Early life and education
Brüderle was born in Berlin, and grew up in Landau. He was an exchange student in Lyon.

Brüderle holds a Diplom in Economics from the University of Mainz. He also earned a doctorate and worked at the university until he entered politics, first at the municipal level and then at the state level, for Rhineland Palatinate.

Political career

Brüderle served as a member of the German Bundestag between 1998 and 2013. At the 2009 election he unsuccessfully contested the Mainz constituency, but was elected to the Bundestag for the Rhineland-Palatinate land list.

Minister for Economic Affairs and Technology, 2009–2011 

 Petrol prices 

In May 2008, Brüderle said, for two-thirds of every gas station bill supported by the State responsibility. He demanded to abolish the road tax in addition to the eco-tax, it is sufficient if "only the real consumption" will be touched by mineral oil from the Treasury. 
Neither he as economy minister in the federal government since 2009 nor the FDP  voiced these demands  again.

 State aid for Opel 

On 9 June 2010 Brüderle refused a request from Opel Germany to 1.1 billion euro in the form of state aid. On the same day Chancellor Angela Merkel gave Opel vague hope of a bailout stating: "The last word on the future of Opel is still out." "The state is not the better entrepreneur" was a justification Brüderle for his vote. The state aid would have resulted in his opinion, to serious distortions of competition in the industry. However, a government decision, there was not, as General Motors and Opel / Vauxhall in Europe applied for no more state aid .

 Unbundling law 

This would allow the State to dismantle dominant corporations (even without concrete reason) when the competition can not otherwise be made. The German power companies then turned against such a bill. In May 2010 Brüderle defused the bill.

Financial crisis

On 14 September 2011, Brüderle announced that an article written for the newspaper Die Welt by Vice Chancellor Philipp Rösler, about the possible benefits of a Greek bankruptcy for the rest of the euro zone, confirmed the opinion of a number of European finance ministers.

Chairman of the FDP parliamentary group, 2011–2013 
During his time in office, Brüderle mainly focused on European policy issues as a result of the continent's sovereign debt crisis. By 2012, in the face of growing criticism of the Merkel government's policies, he publicly stated that Germany "could reach the stage at which a referendum on Europe becomes necessary."

In January 2013, party chairman Philipp Rösler offered to the party leadership to step down in favour of Brüderle, then the favoured choice of many FDP members to lead the party into that year's national election. Brüderle declined, and both agreed that Rösler would stay on as party leader, while Brüderle would be the face of the FDP's election campaign.

Other activities

State agencies
 Federal Network Agency for Electricity, Gas, Telecommunications, Posts and Railway (BNetzA), Member of the Advisory Board (1998–2009)
 Landesbank Rheinland-Pfalz, Member of the Board of Guarantors (1998–2008)

Corporate boards
 KfW, Ex-officio Member of the Board of Supervisory Directors (2009–2011)
 Deutsche Bank, Member of the Advisory Board (1998–2009)
 Provinzial Rheinland Versicherung AG, Member of the Supervisory Board (2005-2006)
 IVA Valuation & Advisory AG, Member of the Supervisory Board (2005–2009; since 2011)
 RSBK Strategie Beratung Kommunikation AG, Member of the Advisory Board (2005–2009; since 2013)

Non-profits
 ZDF, Member of the Broadcasting Board
 Center of Market-Oriented Product and Production Management (CMPP), Member of the Advisory Board 
 Stiftung Auge, Member of the Board of Trustees (since 2009)
 German-Israeli Business Association, Member of the Board of Trustees (since 200?)
 Rationalisierungs- und Innovationszentrum der Deutschen Wirtschaft, Member of the Board of Trustees (2009–2013)

Controversy
In the magazine Stern in January 2013, journalist  published an article about alleged advances towards her from the politician during a January 2012 political gathering at a bar in Stuttgart. The advances included asking her for a dance and mainly the suggestive comment that she "could also fill a dirndl" with a look at her breasts, which she interpreted as sexism, sparking a media-wide debate.

Personal life
Brüderle lives in Mainz. He maintains a holiday residence in Lehigh Acres, Florida.

See also
 Sustainable development

References

External links

 Official website 

1945 births
Living people
Politicians from Berlin
Commanders Crosses of the Order of Merit of the Federal Republic of Germany
Economy ministers of Germany
German economists
Members of the Bundestag for Rhineland-Palatinate
Johannes Gutenberg University Mainz alumni
Members of the Landtag of Rhineland-Palatinate
Knights Commander of the Order of Merit of the Federal Republic of Germany
Members of the Bundestag 2009–2013
Members of the Bundestag 2005–2009
Members of the Bundestag 2002–2005
Members of the Bundestag 1998–2002
Members of the Bundestag for the Free Democratic Party (Germany)